Liam Chad Hendricks (born 31 May 1994) is a South African rugby union player for  in the Currie Cup and the Rugby Challenge. His regular position is prop.

Rugby career

Western Province

As a scholar at Paarl Boys' High School, Hendricks was eligible to represent  at youth level. He played for them at the Under-16 Grant Khomo Week held in Upington in 2010 and two years later, he played at the premier high school rugby union tournament in South Africa, the Under-18 Craven Week held in Port Elizabeth.

After finishing school, he joined the Western Province Institute and he was a key member of their Under-19 team that played in the 2013 Under-19 Provincial Championship, playing in all twelve of their matches during the competition, starting ten of those and scoring a try in an 18-all draw against . It was a disappointing season for his team though, as they finished in fifth position on the log to miss out on a semi-final spot despite being the defending champions.

At the start of 2014, Hendricks represented the Stellenbosch-based  in the Varsity Cup competition. He played off the bench in all seven of their matches during the regular season as they qualified for the semi-finals by virtue of finishing in third place on the log. He was promoted to the starting line-up for the semi-final, but ended on the losing side as fellow Western Cape side  won the semi-final 20–8. In the second half of 2014, Hendricks was a member of the  team that ended the 2014 Under-21 Provincial Championship as losing finalists. Hendricks' involvement was limited, however, making just two appearances off the bench.

Hendricks had a far bigger role in the s' 2015 season though, appearing in all fourteen of their matches during the competition. He helped Western Province to win ten of those matches to finish top of the log and qualify for a home semi-final against . He came on as a replacement in their 43–20 victory, as well as in the final, in which they beat  52–17 to win the competition.

Eastern Province Kings

Griquas

Hendricks moved to Kimberley during 2016 to join .

References

1994 births
Living people
Eastern Province Elephants players
Griquas (rugby union) players
Yacare XV players
Pumas (Currie Cup) players
Rugby union players from Bellville, South Africa
Rugby union props
South African rugby union players
Southern Kings players
Western Province (rugby union) players